Quattrocchi is an Italian surname. Notable people with the surname include:

Andrea Quattrocchi Rivarola (born 1989), Paraguayan actress and ballerina
Fabrizio Quattrocchi (1968–2004), Italian terrorism victim
Luigi Beltrame Quattrocchi (1880–1951), Italian Catholic layman, beatified with his wife by Pope John Paul II
Ottavio Quattrocchi (1938–2013), Italian businessman
Robert Quattrocchi, American politician
Rocco Quattrocchi (1927–2015), American politician

See also
Suzy Quatro

Italian-language surnames